Harbourne Blue is a goat's cheese produced by Ben Harris at Ticklemore Cheese Company in Devon, near Totnes, England. It is made by hand by using local milk. Maturation is around 10 weeks in which it forms a crumby, dense and firm texture with 48% fat content. It can easily overwhelm milder cheeses as the flavours are spicy and assertive.

See also
 List of British cheeses
 List of goat milk cheeses

References

External links
Ticklemore Cheese
"Fromage of the Day, 09.30.11: Harbourne Blue", The Joy of Cheese.
"Harbourne Blue", Ideas in Food.

English cheeses
Goat's-milk cheeses
Devonshire cuisine